MIR (Russian:МИР) is a series of early Soviet transistorized minicomputers. It was developed from 1965 (MIR), 1968 (MIR-1) to 1969 (MIR-2). The development team was led by Victor Glushkov.

Overview 
MIR (МИР) stands for «Машина для Инженерных Расчётов» (Machine for Engineering Calculations) and means both "world" and "peace" in Russian.  It was designed as a relatively small-scale computer for use in engineering and scientific applications.  Among other innovations, it contained a hardware implementation of a high-level programming language capable of symbolic manipulations with fractions, polynomials, derivatives and integrals.  Another innovative feature for that time was the user interface combining a keyboard with a monitor and light pen used for correcting texts and drawing on screen.

Technical specifications 
Technical specifications for MIR-1:
 memory unit: 4096 12-bit words of core memory (access time 2.5 microseconds, memory cycle time 16 microseconds)
 external storage: 8-track punched tape. Input device: paper tape reader FS-1501 (up to 1500 symbols/second). Output device: tape punch PL-80 (up to 80 characters per second)
 performance: 200-300 arithmetic operations per second on five-digit numbers
 power consumption: 1.5 kW (using 380V three-phase electric power)
 weight: about 400 kg

See also 
 List of Russian inventions

References

External links 
 Description of Mir series of computers 
 MIR-2

Soviet inventions
Soviet computer systems
Minicomputers